Jore is a 2004 Indian Tamil-language action comedy film directed by Selva, starring Sathyaraj and Sibiraj. It was released on 11 June 2004. The film was opened to positive reviews from the film critics and audience.

Plot

Sabapathy (Sathyaraj) is a widower who owns a cinema theater and school. He treats his son Sakthi (Sibiraj) like his friend. At college, he rode a horse into the sunset (Gajala), the daughter of a corrupt politician named Lingam (Kota Srinivasa Rao). Afterwards, Lingam's son Vijay (Ramana) clashes against Sakthi at the college election. Despite having support from his father, Vijay loses the election. Lingam then enters into the conflict. In the end, Sakthi kills both Lingam and Vijay.

Cast

Sathyaraj as Sabapathy
Sibiraj as Sakthi
Gajala as Shalini
Bhanupriya as Meenakshi
Vadivelu as Thirupathi
Kota Srinivasa Rao as Lingam
Ramana as Vijay
Sathyapriya as Lingam's wife
Sharmili as Pamela
Sindhu
Viji Chandrasekhar
Theni Kunjarammal
Bala Singh
Thennavan
Thambi Ramaiah
Besant Ravi
Swathi Shanmugam
O. A. K. Sundar as Police inspector
Cheran Raj
Krishnamoorthy
Chelladurai
Vijay Ganesh
Nellai Siva

Production
After his debut film Student Number 1, Sibiraj signs his second film with the same production banner, Sena Films. And this time sharing frames with him is father Satyaraj, the duo carrying their real-life roles into reel-life and playing father and son. While Gajala plays the romantic interest of Sibiraj, Bhanupriya plays Satyaraj's wife in the film.

The cast also includes Telugu villain Kota Srinivasa Rao (of 'Saamy' fame) and Vadivelu among others. Shooting commenced at Pollachi on 25 December, with a schedule of about 30 days at locations in Udumalaipettai and Marayur. The songs are to be shot abroad.

Soundtrack 

The film score and the soundtrack were composed by Deva. The soundtrack, released in 2004, features 5 tracks with lyrics written by Piraisoodan, Na. Muthukumar, Kabilan and Annamalai. Indiaglitz.com said : "Deva's music falls flat".

Reception

Indiaglitz described the film as "A typical 'masala' film, Jore with its loose screenplay and amateur twists and turns, can be rightly called as as(sic) 'bore'" and criticized that "director Selvah has given old wine in a new bottle". But praised the comedy scenes : "Interestingly, it is Sathyaraj and Vadivelu who provide relief to the audience in the movie". Bizhat described "It's interesting to watch the father - son combination together in Jore. Sibi Raj has matched up to his father's acting and gives a good account as an actor".

References

2004 films
Films scored by Deva (composer)
2000s Tamil-language films
Films directed by Selva (director)